Peace Thru Vandalism / When in Rome Do as The Vandals is a compilation album by the southern California punk rock band The Vandals. It was originally released in 1989 by Restless Records (and later reissued Time Bomb Recordings, a record label founded by Social Distortion frontman Mike Ness). It is a CD re-release of the band's first EP, Peace thru Vandalism, and first LP, When in Rome Do as The Vandals, containing all of the tracks from both releases.  The Restless version has the tracks from When In Rome Do As The Vandals first while the Time Bomb version has the two records in chronological order.

In the album's liner notes Brent Turner is credited as having performed all of the bass tracks on When in Rome Do as the Vandals, however by the time of that album's release Chalmer Lumary had joined the band on the bass position. Lumary is therefore listed in the liner notes as the band's official bass player. The liner notes also erroneously list Joe Escalante as writing and composing the entirety of the album's content, whereas the majority was written by Stevo and Jan Nils Ackermann. Furthermore, many tracks from Peace Thru Vandalism had been written and performed prior to Escalante's involvement in the band, adding to the suspicious nature of the inclusion.

Track listing
"Wanna Be Manor" (Ackermann/Jensen)
"Urban Struggle" (Ackermann/Jensen)
"The Legend of Pat Brown" (Ackermann/Jensen)
"Pirate's Life" (Ackermann/Escalante)
"H.B. Hotel" (originally performed by Elvis Presley) (Presley/Durden/Axton)
"Anarchy Burger (Hold the Government)" (Escalante/Jensen)
"Ladykiller" (Escalante/Jensen)
"Birthday Bash" (Escalante/Jensen)
"Master Race (In Outer Space)" (Escalante/Jensen)
"Big Bro vs. Johnny Sako" (Escalante/Jensen/Ackermann)
"Mohawk Town" (Ackermann/Jensen)
"Viking Suit" (Escalanete/Jensen/Ackermann)
"Hocus Pocus" (originally performed by Focus)
"I'm a Fly" (Escalante/Jensen/Ackermann)
"Slap of Love" (Ackermann/Jensen)
"Airstream" (Escalante/Jensen)
"Rico" (Ackermann/Jensen)

Writing credits are as they appear on the original Restless Records CD.  Later versions credit all songs to Joe Escalante.

Performers
Steven Ronald "Stevo" Jensen - vocals, scratch box on "Ladykiller"
Jan Nils Ackermann - guitar, acoustic guitars on "Mohawk Town" and "Rico"
Steve Pfauter - bass (tracks 1-6)
Brent Turner - bass (tracks 7-17)
Joe Escalante - drums, trumpet on "Rico"
Brett Gurewitz - backing vocals on "Anarchy Burger (Hold the Government)"
Chalmer Lumary - backing vocals (tracks 7-17)

Album information
Record label: Restless Records, Time Bomb Recordings (reissue)
Produced by Thom Wilson
All songs written by The Vandals, copyright 1982, 1984 and 1989 Greco Roman Publishing, except "H.B. Hotel" by Elvis Presley and "Hocus Pocus" by Focus.
Front cover art by Fritz Quadrata and Art Bad
Back cover art & design by Mike Doud
Back cover photos by Alan Newberg

References

The Vandals albums
Albums produced by Thom Wilson
1989 compilation albums
Time Bomb Recordings compilation albums